The Nimrud Letters are an archive of 244 Neo-Assyrian and Neo-Babylonian cuneiform letters found at Nimrud in 1952 during the excavations led by Max Mallowan of the British School of Archaeology. The letters were published by H. W. F. Saggs.

The majority of the tablets were found in Room ZT 4, where ZT stands for Z[iggurat]T[errace]. 

105 tablets (99 Neo-Assyrian and 6 Neo-Babylonian) were first published between 1955 and 1974 in the journal Iraq (vols. 17–36), and the remaining 139 were published in 2001 in Saggs' book The Nimrud Letters, 1952.

Bibliography

References

1952 archaeological discoveries
1st-millennium BC literature